T. E. Vasudevan (16 July 1917 – 30 December 2014) was an Indian film producer, who worked mainly in Malayalam cinema. He is the first ever winner of the J. C. Daniel Award, Kerala government's highest honour for contributions to Malayalam cinema, which he received in 1992.

Biography 
Vasudevan was born to A. Sankara Menon and T. Yeshoda Amma on 16 July 1917. At 21, T. E. Vasudevan entered the Kerala film industry as an exhibitor in Tripunithura in Ernakulam District.

As a pioneering film distributor in Kerala, Vasudevan started a film distribution office, Associated Pictures (P) Ltd. at Tripunithura in 1940.  In less than 10 years he had brought to Kerala more than a 1,000 feature films in different languages such as Malayalam, Tamil, Telugu, Hindi, Canarese and Sinhalese and became one of the prominent film distributor of the State.

Vasudevan was the founder member of Kerala Film Chamber of Commerce in 1955 and served as president between 1995 and 96. He was founder president of Malayala Chalachitra Parishad Madras in 1968 and served it in the same capacity for 10 consecutive years. He was founder member of Kerala Film Producers Association at Ernakulam in 1989 and served as its president for four years.

He was a member in the Executive Committee of South Indian Film Chamber of Commerce at Madras between 1955–1980. He was also a member in Raw Film Steering Committee Madras for five years. He worked for five years to compile a history of the Malayalam Film Industry from the period 1928 to 2000, under the auspices of Kerala Film Chamber of Commerce. Kerala State Chalachitra Academy took the responsibility of printing and publishing his work in book form with him and the chairman of the Academy as joint editors. Though the Academy has released a CD Rom including details from his work, the book is yet to be published.

He died on 30 December 2014 at his residence in Panampilly Nagar, Kochi, following age-related illness.

Malayalam filmography 

List of Malayalam films produced by T. E. Vasudevan.

Awards 
 J. C. Daniel Award (Highest Film Award) instituted by Kerala Government (1992)
 The South Indian Film Industry honoured him during the Platinum Jubilee of Indian Film Industry (1989).
 Lifetime achievement award by Rotary International (District 3200) (2002)
 Chalachitra Ratna Award by Kerala Film Critics Association, Thiruvananthapuram (2009)
 Lifetime Achievement Award by the World Malayalee Council (2010).
 Honored by the All Kerala Photographers' Association (2012).

The following of his Malayalam films have won National Film Awards though T. E. Vasudevan never went to New Delhi to accept the award.  Also in 1970, Vasudevan announced that he would cease submitting films for National Awards to make way for newcomers.

 Snehaseema (1954)
 Nair Pidicha Pulival (1956)
 Puthiya Aakasam Puthiya Bhoomi (1964)
 Kavyamela (1965)
 Ezhuthathakatha (1970)

References

External links 
 
 
 The dream merchant turns 85, The Hindu
 The time when KING KONG almost hit him
 Interview on Mathrubhumi News

1917 births
Kerala State Film Award winners
Film producers from Kochi
Malayalam film producers
2014 deaths
20th-century Indian businesspeople
J. C. Daniel Award winners